The Environmental Change Network (ECN) was established in 1992 by the Natural Environment Research Council (NERC) to monitor long-term environmental change and its effects on ecosystems at a series of sites throughout Great Britain and Northern Ireland. Measurements made include a wide range of physical, chemical and biological variables.

See also 
Climate change

External links
 Environmental Change Network website

Environment of the United Kingdom
Natural Environment Research Council